The 1999 Victory Bowl, the second edition of the annual game, was a college football bowl game played on Saturday, November 27, 1999, at Fawcett Stadium in Canton, Ohio. It featured the MidAmerica Nazarene Pioneers against the Geneva Golden Tornadoes.  The Tornadoes won 31–26.

Victory Bowl
Victory Bowl
Victory Bowl
Geneva Golden Tornadoes football bowl games
MidAmerica Nazarene Pioneers football bowl games
Sports in Canton, Ohio
November 1999 sports events in the United States
1999 in sports in Ohio